Ananda Max Salomon (January 15, 1891 – 5 July 1944) was an American film director and studio manager at Teddington Studios.

Salomon was born in Heidelberg, Baden-Württemberg, Germany, and moved to San Francisco when he was one year old. His father, Max Salomon, was born in Illinois and his mother, Wilhelmina "Minna" Welte Salomon, was German. He was a cousin of Jack L. Warner's first wife Irma Solomons (1916–1935), and became Warner's first employee, and eventually head of Warner's British operation.

He was killed in a V-1 flying bomb attack at Warner Bros. Studios in Teddington, Staines, while recording the sound of the V-1s.

Salomon was cremated and his ashes returned to San Francisco. He was survived by his wife, Joan Denise Salomon.

Films
The Side Show Jack Born and Elmer Lawrence sound short Vitaphone 1928

References

External links

1891 births
1944 deaths
American film directors
American Jews
German emigrants to the United States
American civilians killed in World War II
Deaths by airstrike during World War II